Major-General Patrick Ronayne Cleburne (March 16, 1828November 30, 1864) was a senior officer of the Confederate States Army who commanded infantry in the Western Theater of the American Civil War.

Born in Ireland, Cleburne served in the 41st Regiment of Foot of the British Army after failing to gain entrance into Trinity College of Medicine, Dublin in 1846. He served at Fort Westmorland on Spike Island and was present on the island in 1849 when Queen Victoria visited Cork Harbour. Three years after joining the Army, he immigrated to the United States. At the beginning of the American Civil War, Cleburne sided with the Confederate States. He progressed from being a private soldier in the local militia to a division commander. He participated in many unsuccessful military campaigns, especially the Battle of Stones River, the Battle of Missionary Ridge and the Battle of Ringgold Gap. He was also present at the Battle of Shiloh. Known as the "Stonewall of the West", Cleburne was killed leading his men at the Battle of Franklin.

Early life
Patrick Ronayne Cleburne was born in Ovens, County Cork, Ireland (then part of the UK), the second son of Dr. Joseph Cleburne, a middle-class physician of Protestant Anglo-Irish ancestry. Patrick's mother died when he was 18 months old, and he was an orphan at 15. He followed his father into the study of medicine, but failed his entrance exam to Trinity College of Medicine in 1846. In response to this failure, he enlisted in the 41st Regiment of Foot of the British Army, subsequently rising to the rank of corporal.  Cleburne served at Fort Westmorland on Spike Island in Cork Harbour, a large fortress that was then being used as a convict depot.  Seeing the wretched famine victims filling the prison cells, he was further motivated to emigrate with his family to America. 

Three years after joining the British Army, Cleburne bought his discharge and emigrated to the United States with two brothers and a sister. After spending a short time in Ohio, he settled in Helena, Arkansas, where he was employed as a pharmacist and was readily accepted into the town's social order. During this time, Cleburne became close friends with Thomas C. Hindman, who later paralleled his course as a Confederate major general. The two men also formed a business partnership with William Weatherly to buy a newspaper, the Democratic Star, in December 1855.

In 1856, Cleburne and Hindman were both wounded by gunshots during a street fight in Helena with members of the Know-Nothing Party following a debate. Cleburne was shot in the back, turned around and shot one of his attackers, killing him. The attackers hid until Cleburne collapsed on the street and then left. After the two recovered, they appeared before a grand jury to respond to all charges brought against them. They were exonerated, and afterward, went to Hindman's parents' house in Mississippi. By 1860, he was a naturalized citizen, a practicing lawyer, and very popular with the local residents.

American Civil War
When the issue of secession reached a crisis, Cleburne sided with the Southern states. His choice was not due to any love of slavery, which he claimed not to care about, but out of affection for the Southern people who had adopted him as one of their own. As the crisis mounted, Cleburne joined the local militia company (Yell Rifles) as a private soldier. He was soon elected captain. He led the company in the seizure of the U.S. Arsenal at Little Rock in January 1861. When Arkansas left the Union, the Yell Rifles became part of the 1st Arkansas Infantry. Cleburne's regiment was assigned to the force under William Hardee, training in northeast Arkansas and conducting brief operations in southeast Missouri before Hardee's force was ordered to cross the Mississippi River and join Albert Sidney Johnston's Army of Central Kentucky in the fall 1861. The 1st Arkansas was designated the 15th Arkansas in late 1861. Cleburne was promoted to brigadier general on March 4, 1862.

Johnston withdrew his army from Bowling Green, Kentucky, through Tennessee, and into Mississippi before electing to attack the invading Union forces under Ulysses S. Grant. Cleburne served at the Battle of Shiloh, leading a brigade on left side of the Confederate line, as well as at the siege of Corinth. That fall, Cleburne and his men were transported to Tennessee in preparation of Braxton Bragg's Confederate Heartland Offensive.  In that campaign, Cleburne was loaned to Edmund Kirby Smith, whose smaller army led the invasion. At the Battle of Richmond (Kentucky), Cleburne was wounded in the face when a minie ball pierced his left cheek, smashed several teeth, and exited through his mouth, but he recovered in time to re-join Hardee and Bragg and participate in the Battle of Perryville. After the Army of Tennessee retreated to its namesake state in late 1862, Cleburne was promoted to division command and served at the Battle of Stones River, where his division advanced three miles as it routed the Union right wing and drove it back to the Nashville Pike and its final line of defense. He was promoted to major general on December 13.

During the campaigns of 1863 in Tennessee, Cleburne and his soldiers fought at the Battle of Chickamauga. They successfully resisted a much larger Union force under Maj. Gen. William T. Sherman on the northern end of Missionary Ridge during the Battle of Missionary Ridge, and Joseph Hooker at the Battle of Ringgold Gap in northern Georgia, in which Cleburne's men again protected the Army of Tennessee as it retreated to Tunnel Hill, Georgia. Cleburne and his troops received an official Thanks from the Confederate Congress for their actions during this campaign.

Cleburne's strategic use of terrain, his ability to hold ground where others failed, and his talent in foiling the movements of the enemy earned him fame, and gained him the nickname "Stonewall of the West." Federal troops were quoted as dreading to see the blue flag of Cleburne's Division across the battlefield. General Robert E. Lee referred to him as "a meteor shining from a clouded sky".

Proposal for Emancipation and Enlistment of Blacks
By late 1863, it had become obvious to Cleburne that the Confederacy was losing the war because of the growing limitations of its manpower and resources. In 1864, he dramatically called together the leadership of the Army of Tennessee and put forth the proposal to emancipate all slaves ("emancipating the whole race upon reasonable terms, and within such reasonable time") in order to "enlist their sympathies" and thereby enlist them in the Confederate Army to secure Southern independence. Cleburne argued that emancipation did not have to include black equality, noting that "necessity and wise legislation" would ensure relations between blacks and whites would not materially change. This proposal was met with polite silence at the meeting, and while word of it leaked out, it went unremarked, much less officially recognized. From his letter outlining the proposal:

Cleburne's proposal was vigorously attacked as an "abolitionist conspiracy" by General William H. T. Walker, who strongly supported slavery and also saw Cleburne as a rival for promotion. Walker eventually persuaded the commander of the Army of Tennessee, General Braxton Bragg, that Cleburne was politically unreliable and undeserving of further promotion. "Three times in the summer of 1863 he was passed over for corps commander and remained a division commander until his death."

Death and legacy

Prior to the campaigning season of 1864, Cleburne became engaged to Susan Tarleton of Mobile, Alabama. Their marriage was never to be, as Cleburne was killed during an ill-conceived assault (which he opposed) on Union fortifications at the Battle of Franklin, just south of Nashville, Tennessee, on November 30, 1864. He was last seen advancing on foot toward the Union line with his sword raised, after his horse was shot out from under him. Accounts later said that he was found just inside the Union line, and his body was carried back to an aid station along the Columbia Turnpike. Confederate war records indicate he died of a shot to the abdomen, or possibly a bullet through his heart. When Confederates found his body, he had been picked clean of any valuable items, including his sword, boots, and pocket watch.

According to a letter written to General Cheatham from Judge Mangum after the war, Cleburne's remains were first laid to rest at Rose Hill Cemetery in Columbia, Tennessee. At the urging of Army Chaplain Bishop Quintard, Judge Mangum, staff officer to Cleburne and his law partner in Helena, Cleburne's remains were moved to St. John's Episcopal Church near Mount Pleasant, Tennessee, where they remained for six years. He had first observed St. John's during the Army of Tennessee's march into Tennessee during the campaign that led to the Battle of Franklin, and commented that it was the place he would like to be buried because of its great beauty and resemblance to his Irish homeland. In 1870, he was disinterred and returned to his adopted hometown of Helena, Arkansas, with much fanfare, and buried in the Confederate section of Maple Hill Cemetery, overlooking the Mississippi River.

William J. Hardee, Cleburne's former corps commander, had this to say when he learned of his loss: "Where this division defended, no odds broke its line; where it attacked, no numbers resisted its onslaught, save only once; and there is the grave of Cleburne."

Several geographic features are named after Patrick Cleburne, including Cleburne County in Alabama and Arkansas, and the city of Cleburne, Texas (which also features a statue of Patrick). The location where he was killed in Franklin was reclaimed by preservationists, and is now known as Cleburne Park. Though the small monument in the park is often perceived as a monument to Cleburne, it actually is a marker to show where the Carter Family Cotton Gin once stood (the gin being an integral part of the Battle of Franklin, and the Carter House itself being the headquarters of Union Brigadier General Jacob D. Cox).

The Patrick R. Cleburne Confederate Cemetery is a memorial cemetery in Jonesboro, Georgia, which was named in honor of General Patrick Cleburne.

In popular culture
 Cleburne is the subject of Justin S. Murphy's 2008 graphic novel, Cleburne.
 Cleburne plays a prominent role in Daniel F. Korn's novel about Shiloh, Dawn's Gray Steel.
 Cleburne is a major character in the alternate history novel Shattered Nation: An Alternate History Novel of the American Civil War, by Jeffrey Evan Brooks.
 Cleburne is prominent in The Fenians' song "Rebel Sons of Erin."
 He has been the subject of a handful of biographies, including Stonewall of the West: Patrick Cleburne and the Civil War by Craig Symonds and the anthology A Meteor Shining Brightly, edited by Mauriel Phillips Joslyn.
 In the alternate history novel 1862 by Robert Conroy, General Cleburne defects to the Union after the British join the war on the side of the Confederacy.
 In The Great War: American Front, part of Harry Turtledove's Southern Victory Series, Cleburne is still alive in 1914, and briefly appears with Stephen Ramseur attending a speech given by President Woodrow Wilson in Richmond that confirms the Confederacy's commitment to the Quadruple Entente.
"Stonewall of the West", from the CD/album, Cross Over the River; Confederate Collection, by singer-songwriter Jed Marum, 2006
 During a 1994 interview (00:40:20) on Book TV, when asked his favorite "Civil War character" by C-SPAN's Brian Lamb, author Shelby Foote says: "It's easy to state who your favorites are because they're many people's favorites — Robert E. Lee, U.S. Grant, Stonewall Jackson, Tecumseh Sherman. But I have some favorites that are grievously neglected. One of them is an Arkansas general named Pat Cleburne, Patrick Ronayne Cleburne, from Arkansas [sic]. And he probably was the best division commander on either side, and in his day — he was killed at Franklin about a year before the end of the war — he was called the Stonewall Jackson of the West and well-known and adored by his men. He's been largely forgotten today. He's buried right there at Helena [Arkansas] where Crowley's Ridge comes to the Mississippi. I'm very fond of Cleburne. I got the same reaction at Cleburne's death that his men got. I was greatly saddened to lose him. You get a great fondness for these people or a severe dislike for them, and if you have a dislike for them, you lean over backward hoping not to let it show. I'm sure it does."

See also
 List of American Civil War generals
 Bibliography of the American Civil War
 Bibliography of Ulysses S. Grant

Notes

References
 Connelly, Thomas L. Autumn of Glory: The Army of Tennessee 1862–1865. Baton Rouge: Louisiana State University Press, 1971. .
 Du Bose, John Witherspoon. General Joseph Wheeler and the Army of the Tennessee. New York: Neale Publishing Company, 1912. .
 Eicher, John H., and Eicher, David J., Civil War High Commands, Stanford University Press, 2001, .
 Foote, Shelby. The Civil War: A Narrative. Vol. 3, Red River to Appomattox. New York: Random House, 1974. .
 Fredriksen, John C. America's Military Adversaries: From Colonial Times to the Present. Santa Barbara, CA: ABC-CLIO, 2001. .
 Hook, Richard, and Philip R. N. Katcher. American Civil War Commanders. Vol. 4, Confederate Leaders in the West, Oxford: Osprey Publishing, 2003. .
 Jacobson, Eric A., and Richard A. Rupp. For Cause & for Country: A Study of the Affair at Spring Hill and the Battle of Franklin. Franklin, TN: O'More Publishing, 2007. .
 Joslyn, Mauriel. A Meteor Shining Brightly: Essays on the Life and Career of Major General Patrick R. Cleburne. Macon, GA: Mercer University Press, 2000. .
 Levine, Bruce. Confederate emancipation: Southern plans to free and arm slaves during the Civil War. Oxford University Press, 2005. 
 Rand, Clayton. Sons of the South. New York: Holt, Rinehart and Winston, 1961. .
 Reynolds, John Hugh. Makers of Arkansas History. New York: Silver, Burdett and Co., 1905. .
 U.S. War Department. The War of the Rebellion: a Compilation of the Official Records of the Union and Confederate Armies. Washington, DC: U.S. Government Printing Office, 1880–1901.
 Welsh, Jack D. Medical Histories of Confederate Generals. Kent, OH: Kent State University Press, 1999. .

Further reading
   (First published 1908 by Neale Publishing Co.)
    (First published 1898 by Tunnah & Pittard)
 Purdue, Howell, and Elizabeth Purdue. Pat Cleburne, Confederate General: A Definitive Biography. Hillsboro, TX: Hill Junior College Press, 1973. .
 Stewart, Bruce H. Invisible Hero: Patrick R. Cleburne. Macon, GA: Mercer University Press, 2009. .
 Symonds, Craig L. Stonewall of the West: Patrick Cleburne and the Civil War. Lawrence: University Press of Kansas, 1997. .

External links
 

 

1828 births
1864 deaths
19th-century British Army personnel
Military personnel from County Cork
41st Regiment of Foot soldiers
American people of Anglo-Irish descent
Burials in Arkansas
Confederate States Army major generals
Confederate States of America military personnel killed in the American Civil War
Irish Anglicans
Irish emigrants to the United States (before 1923)
Irish soldiers in the British Army
Irish soldiers in the Confederate States Army
People from County Cork
People of Arkansas in the American Civil War
People from Helena, Arkansas